Kalindi is a mountain of the Garhwal Himalaya in Uttarakhand India. It lies 1.1 km North of Avalanche Peak (India)  its nearest higher neighbor. Mana Parbat II  lies 4.2 km NNW and it is 6.1 km NNE of Chandra Parbat I .

Climbing history
It was first climbed by Frank Smythe and Eric Shipton on 20 July 1931. While trying to establish a crossing of the Great Himalayan watershed into Tehri-Garhwal in the entirely unknown area at the head of the Arwa valley from Mana Badrinath side.

In 1947 on August 1, A Swiss team under the leadership of André Roch climbed Kalindi Peak by the N.E. arête. Other members of the party were Mme. Annalies Lohner, René Dittert, Alfred Sutter, Alexander Graven and Tenzing Norgay.

The third ascent on July 15, 1971, by Bibhas Das, Bijendra Singh Negi, Instructors Ujagar Singh and Ratan Singh. They start at 5:45 and reached the summit of Kalindi at nine A.M. The last 500 feet were rocky.

Neighboring and subsidiary peaks
Neighboring or subsidiary peaks of Kalindi:
 Chandra Parbat I 
 Mana Parbat II 
 Avalanche Peak (India)

Glaciers and rivers
Kalindi falls at the watershed of Arwa Valley and Gangotri it has Chaturangi Glacier on the Western side and Arwa Glacier on the Eastern side. Chaturangi Glacier which drains itself at Gangotri Glacier from there emerges Bhagirathi river. one of the main tributaries of the river Ganga. On the other side, Arwa Glacier drain itself at Saraswati River that later joins Alaknanda River the other main tributaries of river Ganga that later joins Bhagirathi river at Devprayag and became Ganga thereafter.

See also

 List of Himalayan peaks of Uttarakhand

References

Mountains of Uttarakhand
Six-thousanders of the Himalayas
Geography of Chamoli district